Timerio is a constructed language based on numbers. It was presented to public in 1921 by the Berlin architect Tiemer as a pure literary language and should be used for automated translations. The idea was, that every concept is assigned by a number. The language shows similarities to the Dewey Decimal Classification by Melvil Dewey.

One of the only known sentences is the number-combination , which means I love you. Here the  stands for I,  for you (accusative or objective) and 80 for [to] love. Alternatively,  can also be used as a description of you (singular, nominative) according to some forms. Given the basic concept that  equals I, and that the designation starts from that viewpoint onwards, it is a logical alternative to accept  as another term for you.

A prefix of  makes a root an adjective. The genitive takes the suffix , the dative takes . Tenses are shown with an underscore below the number (past) or a macron above (future). The plural takes superscript 2. Numbers when expressed in a numerical form appear inside brackets. 

“” means: “I’ll write three letters”.
“” means: “The father loved the big coloured letters”.

References 

Constructed languages
Constructed languages introduced in the 1920s
Translation
1921 introductions